The 1953 Ball State Cardinals football team was an American football team that represented Ball State Teachers College (later renamed Ball State University) in the Indiana Collegiate Conference (ICC) during the 1953 college football season. In their first season under head coach George Serdula, the Cardinals compiled a 5–2–1 record (3–2 against ICC opponents).

Schedule

References

Ball State
Ball State Cardinals football seasons
Ball State Cardinals football